Phiphat Saengwong (born August 29, 1999), is a Thai professional footballer who plays as a central midfielder for Thai League 2 club Udon Thani.

Club career
In youth career Phiphat Saengwong  join the youth academy of S.C. Braga in Portugal.

Honours

Club

References

External links

1998 births
Living people
Phiphat Saengwong
Association football midfielders
Phiphat Saengwong
Phiphat Saengwong
Phiphat Saengwong
Phiphat Saengwong
Thai expatriate footballers
Thai expatriate sportspeople in Portugal
Phiphat Saengwong